Kaposvári KK, also known as Kometa Kaposvári KK for sponsorship reasons, is a Hungarian professional basketball team based in Kaposvár, Hungary. The team plays in the Nemzeti Bajnokság I/A, the highest professional league in Hungary. The team was founded in 1960.

Honours

Domestic competitions
Nemzeti Bajnokság I/A (National Championship of Hungary)
 Champions (2): 2000–01, 2003–04
 Runners-up (1): 2002–03

Magyar Kupa (National Cup of Hungary)
 Winners (1): 2004
 Finalist (1): 2001

European competitions
FIBA Europe Regional Challenge Cup for Men 3. place (2002–2003)

Season by season

 Cancelled due to the COVID-19 pandemic in Hungary.

Current roster

Notable players
 Szilárd Benke (2012-16)
 Matija Češković (2007-08, 2009-10)
 Wayne Chism (2013-14)
 Branislav Dzunić (2001-05)
 Gordan Filipović (1992-99, 2000-07)
 Sterling Gibbs (2017-18)
 Emir Halimić (2000-01)
 Roland Hendlein (2003-10, 2012-)
 Stojan Ivković (2000-04)
 Kęstutis Marčiulionis (2005-06, 2008-09)
 Erron Maxey (2005-06)
 László Orosz (1998-00, 2006-10)
 Balázs Simon (2000-04)
 Marko Špica (2012-13, 2014-16, 2017-19)
 Marcel Țenter (1996-97)
 Zoltán Trepák (2003-06)
 Emmanuel Ubilla (2015-16, 2018-19)
 Dávid Vojvoda (2006-10)

References

External links
Official website 
Team profile at eurobasket.com

Basketball teams in Hungary